Marios Pashialis (born October 30, 1970) is a former international Cypriot football defender who played for Ethnikos Achnas of Cyprus. He also played for Anorthosis Famagusta.

He has 7 international caps with Cyprus national football team.

References

External links
 

1970 births
Living people
Cypriot footballers
Cyprus under-21 international footballers
Cyprus international footballers
Ethnikos Achna FC players
Anorthosis Famagusta F.C. players
Cypriot First Division players
Association football defenders